KRRZ (1390 AM, "Classic Hits 1390") is a classic hits radio station in Minot, North Dakota, owned by iHeartMedia through licensee iHM Licenses, LLC. KRRZ also airs Minnesota Vikings football games and The Rush Limbaugh Show.

iHeartMedia, Inc. also owns and operates KYYX 97.1 (Country), KCJB 910 (Country/Talk), KIZZ 93.7 (Top 40), KMXA-FM 99.9 (AC), and KZPR 105.3 (Mainstream Rock) in Minot.
 
On May 20, 2019, iHeartMedia requested to transfer the license of KRRZ back from Aloha Station Trust II LLC to its portfolio. The assignment of the license was consummated on July 2, 2019.

References

External links
Classic Hits 1390 website

RRZ
Classic hits radio stations in the United States
IHeartMedia radio stations
Radio stations established in 1929
1929 establishments in North Dakota
Ward County, North Dakota